Aasai Thambi is a 1998 Indian Tamil-language drama film, written and directed by Senthilnathan. The film stars Arun Pandian, Abbas and Anju Aravind, while Manivannan and Ajay Rathnam portray supporting roles. Music for the film was composed by Adithyan and the film opened to mixed reviews in September 1998.

Cast
 Arun Pandian as Vinoth
 Abbas as Vijay
 Anju Aravind as Indhu
 Manivannan
 Ajay Rathnam
 Jayabharathi
 Madhan Bob

Soundtrack
The music was composed by Aadithyan and lyrics were written by Pazhani Bharathi and Kamakodiyan.

Release
The film released in September 1998, despite being ready for release from late 1997. The film performed poorly at the box office.

References

External links

1998 films
1990s Tamil-language films
1990s masala films
Films directed by Senthilnathan